The following is a list of stadiums in Bangkok, Thailand. They are ordered by their seating capacity, that is the maximum number of spectators that the stadium can accommodate in seated areas. The list includes stadiums in the Bangkok Metropolitan Region including the provinces of Nakhon Pathom, Pathum Thani, Nonthaburi, Samut Prakan, and Samut Sakhon.

Bangkok is home to a number of stadiums and sport clubs. The largest stadia are typically for football clubs however there are also a number of venues for other sports which have been constructed for events such as the 1998 Asian Games and 2012 FIFA Futsal World Cup.

# In the Bangkok Metropolitan Region, not the city proper

See also 
 List of football stadiums in Thailand

References 

 
Bangkok
Sport venues in Bangkok